Paul Sabatier University (Université Paul Sabatier, UPS, also known as Toulouse III) is a French public university, in the Academy of Toulouse. It is one of the several successor universities of the University of Toulouse.

Toulouse III was named after Paul Sabatier, winner of the 1912 Nobel prize in chemistry. In 1969, it was established on the foundations of the old Toulouse university that was itself founded in 1229. The Université Paul Sabatier (UPS), an educational leader in France's Midi-Pyrénées region, offers a broad array of programs in the sciences, technology, health, and athletics.

University research activities 
  Space, earth sciences, climate
  Computer science and electronics
  Life sciences
  Water, process engineering, chemistry
  Materials (among others, collaboration with CEMES), solid state physics, aeronautics, astrophysics

Major fields of study 

Major fields of study include sciences, engineering, and athletics.

Bachelor 
The university offers the Licence programs in eight areas: Mathematics, Computer Science and their applications; Engineering; Physics, Chemistry, and their applications; Space Sciences, Organisms, and Biospheres; Life and Health Sciences; Sciences and Techniques of Physical Activity and Sports; Communication and Organizational Management.

Master 
The university offers master's programs in six areas: Informatics and Systems Modeling (in partnership with the École Nationale de l'Aviation Civile); Sciences and techniques of matter and energy; Space sciences; Telecommunications and Computer Networking, Life and health sciences; Social Sciences and Humanities; Management.

A number of bilingual programs have been designed to appeal to international students — among them a Joint European Master in Space Science and Technology, a European Master's in materials for energy storage and conversion, an international Master's in micro and nanotechnologies for wireless communications, a new Master's in Management International of Air Transport and Tourism (MITAT) and a French Master's in agri-food innovations for sustainable agriculture and better products.

Doctorate 
The university accepts doctoral candidates in all of the areas described above.

Health 
 Medicine: medical degree, residency, specialities, doctorate
 Pharmacy: degree in pharmacy, diplôme d’études supérieures (DES), DNO
 Dentistry: degree in dental surgery, certificat d’études supérieures (CES), DES, doctorate

Points of interest
 Arboretum de Jouéou
 Jardin botanique Henri Gaussen

Notable alumni
 Guy Bertrand, chemistry professor at the University of California, San Diego, US
 Pierre Cohen, member of the National Assembly of France
 Bruno Chaudret

See also
 List of public universities in France by academy

References

External links 
 

University of Toulouse
Universities in Occitania (administrative region)
Universities and colleges in Toulouse
1969 establishments in France
Educational institutions established in 1969